Agonopterix takamukui is a moth in the family Depressariidae. It was described by Shōnen Matsumura in 1931. It is found in Japan (Kyushu) and the Russian Far East (Amur and Primorye regions).

References

Moths described in 1931
Agonopterix
Moths of Asia
Moths of Japan